The Knockout Stage of the 1992 Federation Cup Asia/Oceania Zone was the final stage of the Zonal Competition involving teams from Asia and Oceania. Those that qualified for this stage placed first and second in their respective pools, with the exception of the third-placing India, who qualified due to the withdrawing of Philippines.

The four teams were then randomly drawn into a two-stage knockout tournament, with the winner qualifying for the World Group.

Draw

Semifinals

Chinese Taipei vs. India

Sri Lanka vs. South Korea

Final

Chinese Taipei vs. South Korea

  advanced to the World Group.

See also
Fed Cup structure

References

External links
 Fed Cup website

1992 Federation Cup Asia/Oceania Zone